The Electoral Reform Act 2022 is a law of Ireland which amended electoral law and provided for the establishment of an electoral commission titled An Coimisiún Toghcháin.

2021 draft bill 
Negotiations after the February 2020 general election led to the formation in June of a Fianna Fáil–Fine Gael–Green coalition, whose programme for government promised an electoral commission by the end of 2021. Malcolm Noonan was appointed as Minister of State at the Department of Housing, Local Government and Heritage with responsibility for heritage and electoral reform.

The Department of Housing, Local Government and Heritage produced the general scheme of an Electoral Reform Bill, which was approved by the cabinet on 30 December 2020 and published on 8 January 2021. The scheme was submitted for pre-legislative scrutiny to an Oireachtas Joint Committee, which had public meetings with invited parties between 23 January and 22 June and issued its report in August.

The draft bill  sought both to modernise the electoral register and to establish an electoral commission with seven to nine members and a permanent staff. The establishment provisions are modelled on the Policing Authority established in 2015.

The commission would comprise:
 five to seven members appointed by the President of Ireland:
 the chairperson, a current or former judge of the superior courts, nominated by the Chief Justice, appointed for a seven-year term;
 four to six experts recommended by the Commission for Public Service Appointments and nominated by the government with Oireachtas approval for a four-year term
 two  members:
 the Ombudsman
 the Clerk of Dáil Éireann or Seanad Éireann, alternating every four years;

The commission's staff would be members of the Civil Service of the State, with a Chief Executive recommended by the Commission for Public Service Appointments.

The Electoral Reform Bill 2022 was published and introduced to the Dáil on 30 March 2022. Its second reading was on 5–7 April, whereupon it was referred to the Select Committee on Housing, Local Government and Heritage for committee stage, held on 31 May and 1 June. The bill completed remaining Dáil stages on 15 June, and Seanad stages on 21 and 30 June and 6 and 7 July. The Dáil accepted the Seanad amendments on 13 July, and the bill was signed into law by the President on 25 July.

References

2022 in Irish law
Acts of the Oireachtas of the 2020s
Electoral 2022